James Albert Maxwell (October 17, 1886 – December 10, 1961) was a pitcher in Major League Baseball in the early 20th century.  He was born in Texarkana, Arkansas, and died in Brady, Texas.

External links

1886 births
1961 deaths
New York Giants (NL) players
Pittsburgh Pirates players
Philadelphia Athletics players
Brooklyn Tip-Tops players
Baseball players from Arkansas
Major League Baseball pitchers
Pine Bluff Lumbermen players
Galveston Sand Crabs players
Montgomery Senators players
Steubenville Stubs players
Atlanta Crackers players
New Orleans Pelicans (baseball) players
Birmingham Barons players
Toronto Maple Leafs (International League) players
People from Texarkana, Arkansas